Poondi is a village in the Thiruvallur taluk of Tiruvallur district, Tamil Nadu, India. It has a fresh water lake to cater the daily needs of water for Chennai City. The place is also known for Oondreswarar Temple, which was displaced to its current location to ease the construction of the reservoir.

Demographics 
As per the 2001 census, Poondi had a total population of 4090 with 1891 males and 2199 females.

References 

Villages in Tiruvallur district